Goose Bay Airport  is a public airport located 14 miles north of the central business district (CBD) of Anchorage, Alaska, USA.

Airline 
There is no scheduled airline service to this field.

References

External links 
 Alaska FAA airport diagram (GIF)
 Resources for this airport:
 
 
 

Airports in Matanuska-Susitna Borough, Alaska